Fenamiphos is an organophosphate acetylcholinesterase inhibitor used as an insecticide.

References

External links
CDC - NIOSH Pocket Guide to Chemical Hazards
 

Acetylcholinesterase inhibitors
Organophosphate insecticides
Isopropylamino compounds